Tar Hill is an unincorporated community in Grayson County, Kentucky, United States. On April 26, 2011, two tornadoes hit Tar Hill as part of the 2011 Super Outbreak. Farm equipment was reportedly thrown . Other reports stated that this tornado destroyed a house, a mobile home, several barns and other buildings.

References

Unincorporated communities in Grayson County, Kentucky
Unincorporated communities in Kentucky